Anders Byström (born 1 March 1962 in Kungälv, Sweden) is a Swedish actor. He currently lives in Stockholm.

Byström is engaged to write "snapsvisor". He has won the title as Swedish champion of "snapsvisor" three years in a row. He has won three gold medals, two silver medals and three bronze medals in snaps-SM. Most recently he won gold in 2005.
In July, 2006, Byström released a CD with "snapsvisor" called "Byströms bästa snapsvisor", which has 22 songs. Once Byström sings and next time sing it yourself. Just now he has a job as teacher.

Filmography
Anna Holt (1991)
Beck – Hämndens pris (2001)
Woman with Birthmark (2001)
Rederiet (2001-2002)Brother Bear (2003)The Simpsons Movie'' (2007)

References

External links

1962 births
Swedish male actors
Living people